Cadfan or St Cadfan might refer to:

 The Battle of Cadfan, fought between English and Welsh armies in 1257
 Cadfan ap Iago, King of Gwynedd (7th century floruit) 
 John Cadvan Davies (1846–1923), Archdruid of Wales, used the bardic name Cadfan
 Saint Cadfan, founder of a monastery on Bardsey Island (6th century or 7th century floruit)
 St Cadfan's Church, Tywyn in Mid Wales
 The Cadfan Stone in the above church
 St. Cadfan, a diesel locomotive on the Talyllyn Railway